The MCV DD102 is a double-decker bus body built by MCV built on the VDL DB300 chassis.

Hong Kong
In January 2014, Kowloon Motor Bus of Hong Kong received the first example of the bus for evaluation.

See also
MCV DD103, similar bodywork mounted on Volvo B9TL chassis

References

External links
Brochure MCV

Low-floor buses
Double-decker buses